Apolania is a monotypic genus of East African wandering spiders containing the single species, Apolania segmentata, first described from a male found by Eugène Simon in 1898. No females have been described yet, and it has only been found in Seychelles.

References

Critically endangered animals
Ctenidae
Endemic fauna of Seychelles
IUCN Red List critically endangered species
Monotypic Araneomorphae genera
Spiders of Africa
Taxa named by Eugène Simon